Clepsis labisclera is a species of moth of the family Tortricidae. It is found in Cuba.

The wingspan is 14–19 mm. The ground colour of the forewings is pale greyish ferruginous, strigulated (finely streaked) with rust and with rust brown markings. The hindwings are pale brownish cream, but whiter basally.

Etymology
The species name refers to the sclerites of the labia.

References

Moths described in 2010
Clepsis